Hulandasht (also Romanized as Hūlāndasht, Halamdasht, and Holon Dasht, Holūndasht, and Holūn Dasht; also known as ‘Alamdasht) is a village in Dehpir-e Shomali Rural District, in the Central District of Khorramabad County, Lorestan Province, Iran. At the 2006 census, its population was 390, in 82 families.

References 

Towns and villages in Khorramabad County